The Mercedes-Benz Econic is a low-entry truck introduced by Mercedes-Benz in 1998. It is available in weights of 18 t and 26 t and is powered by a 6-cylinder inline engine with turbo and intercooler. It is normally used for waste collection, fire and emergency purposes and airport ground services.

References

External links
The new Mercedes-Benz Econic - official website

Econic
Waste collection vehicles
Fire service vehicles